The following is a list of notable deaths in November 2009.

Entries for each day are listed alphabetically by surname. A typical entry lists information in the following sequence:
 Name, age, country of citizenship at birth, subsequent country of citizenship (if applicable), reason for notability, cause of death (if known), and reference.

November 2009

1
Zev Aelony, 71, American civil rights activist.
Sakher Habash, 69, Palestinian party official (Fatah), stroke.
Esther Hautzig, 79, American Holocaust survivor and writer.
Endel Laas, 94, Estonian forest scientist. 
Manfred Losch, 70, German Olympic athlete.
Seán Mac Fhionnghaile, 57, Irish actor, cancer.
Arturo Salazar Mejía, 88, Colombian Roman Catholic Bishop of Pasto. (Spanish)
Alda Merini, 78, Italian poet. 
Gopal Mishra, 77, Indian journalist.
Gus Mitges, 90, Canadian politician, MP for Grey—Simcoe (1972–1988) and Bruce—Grey (1988–1993).
Alan Ogg, 42, American basketball player (Miami Heat), complications from staphylococcal infection.
Robert H. Rines, 87, American scientist, inventor, composer and Loch Ness Monster expert, heart failure.
Achim Stocker, 74, German football official, chairman of SC Freiburg, heart attack. 
George Zoritch, 92, Russian-born American dancer.

2
Princess Haya bint Abdulaziz, 80, Saudi royal, sister of King Abdullah.
Nien Cheng, 94, Chinese author and political prisoner.
Lou Filippo, 83, American boxing referee and judge, member of the World Boxing Hall of Fame, stroke.
Ida Frabboni, 113, Italian supercentenarian. 
Evelyn Hofer, 87, German-born photographer.
Brian James, 91, Australian actor, complications from a fall.
Shabattai Kalmanovich, 61, Russian former KGB spy, president of WBC Spartak Moscow Region, shot.
Keith Kettleborough, 74, British footballer (Sheffield United).
José Luis López Vázquez, 87, Spanish actor.
Yael Lotan, 74, Israeli writer, editor and translator, liver cancer.
Phil Lumpkin, 57, American NBA player and high school basketball coach, pneumonia.
Ron Moeller, 71, American baseball player.
Roman Moravec, 58, Slovak Olympic athlete. 
Beverley O'Sullivan, 28, Irish singer, car crash.
Amir Pnueli, 68, Israeli computer scientist and Turing Award winner.
Glenn Remick, 58, American founder of American Darters Association, member of National Darts Hall of Fame, amyloidosis.
Mark Smith, 49, British bassist (The Waterboys) and record producer.
Leonard Steinberg, Baron Steinberg, 73, British businessman and life peer.
Lonnie Zamora, 76, American alleged UFO witness, heart failure.

3
Charles August, 90, American businessman, founder of Monro Muffler Brake.
Francisco Ayala, 103, Spanish novelist, natural causes.
Archie Baird, 90, Scottish footballer (Aberdeen).
Carl Ballantine, 92, American actor (McHale's Navy), natural causes.
Brother Blue, 88, American storyteller, performance artist.
Dodo Chichinadze, 84, Georgian actress.
Sir John Crofton, 97, British medical pioneer.
Jean B. Cryor, 70, American politician, cancer.
Shel Dorf, 76, American founder of the San Diego Comic-Con, diabetes-related complications.
Parry Gordon, 64, English rugby league player.
Tamás Lossonczy, 105, Hungarian abstract painter.
Lorissa McComas, 38, American softcore model and actress.
Toshiyuki Mimura, 61, Japanese baseball player and manager (Hiroshima Toyo Carp).
Alice S. Rossi, 87, American sociologist and feminist.

4
Win Aung, 65, Burmese politician and military officer, Minister of Foreign Affairs (1998–2004).
William H. Avery, 98, American politician, representative for Kansas (1955–1965), Governor of Kansas (1965–1967).
Sir Don Beaven, 85, New Zealand scientist and diabetes researcher, house fire.
Ivan Biakov, 65, Russian Olympic gold medal-winning biathlete (1972, 1976)
Hubertus Brandenburg, 85, German-born Roman Catholic Bishop of Stockholm (1977–1998). (Swedish)
Stefano Chiodi, 52, Italian footballer. 
Art D'Lugoff, 85, American jazz nightclub owner (The Village Gate), heart attack.
Kabun Mutō, 82, Japanese politician, Minister for Foreign Affairs (1993), pancreatic cancer.
Thomas P. O'Malley, 79, American academic, president of Loyola Marymount University (1991–1999), heart attack.
Antonio Pelle, 77, Italian 'Ndrangheta boss, heart attack.
David Tree, 94, British actor.
Rishad Shafi, 56, Turkmen drummer.

5
Evan Chandler, 65, American father of Michael Jackson molestation accuser, suicide by gunshot.
*Peter Chen Bolu, 96, Chinese Roman Catholic Bishop of Daming.
I. F. Clarke, 91, British literary scholar.
Roy Collins, 75, English cricketer.
Adam Firestorm, 32, New Zealand-born Canadian professional wrestler, suicide.
Luigi Fuin, 81, Italian footballer.
Félix Luna, 84, Argentinian historian.
Lucien Maelfait, 90, French cyclist.
Barrie Rickards, 71, British palaeontologist and angler, cancer.
Winifred Tumim, Lady Tumim, 73,  British charity executive and campaigner.

6
Manuel Arvizu, 90, Mexican Roman Catholic Bishop of Jesús María del Nayar.
Nick Counter, 69, American film executive and lawyer.
Dimitri De Fauw, 28, Belgian track cyclist, suicide.
Abraham Escudero Montoya, 69, Colombian Roman Catholic Bishop of Palmira. (Spanish)
Robert Hilborn Falls, 85, Canadian admiral, Chief of the Defence Staff (1977–1980).
Waldo Hunt, 88, American publisher.
Jacno, 52, French musician, cancer. 
Otomar Krejča, 87, Czech theatre director. 
Hans Lund, 59, American poker player, cancer.
Antonio Rosario Mennonna, 103, Italian prelate of the Roman Catholic Church. 
Tommy Reis, 95, American baseball player.
Donald Rix, 78, Canadian pathologist and philanthropist.
Manuel Solís, 91, Panamanian President (1988–1989), pulmonary edema. (Spanish)
Ron Sproat, 77, American television writer (Dark Shadows), heart attack.

7
 Yelena Bondarchuk, 47, Russian actress, breast cancer. 
Gene D. Cohen, 65, American psychiatrist, prostate cancer.
Vic Davies, 55, Australian radio presenter, lung cancer.
Bob Dillinger, 91, American baseball player.
Anselmo Duarte, 89, Brazilian actor, screenwriter and film director, complications from a stroke. (Portuguese)
Bernardo Garza Sada, 79, Mexican businessman, founder of ALFA. (Spanish)
Donald Harington, 73, American author, cancer.
Chris Harman, 66, British socialist journalist and activist.
Billy Ingham, 57, British footballer (Burnley).
Joe Maross, 86, American actor, cardiac arrest.
Alayna Morgan, 61, American obese woman.
Allan Mulder, 81, Australian politician, MP (1972–1975).
David C. Smith, 80, American historian.

8
Ellen Ahrndt, 87, American baseball player (All-American Girls Professional Baseball League).
Hiley Edwards, 58, English cricketer (Devon), cancer.
Jerry Fuchs, 34, American drummer (Maserati, !!!), fall.
Armin Gessert, 46, German video game developer, heart attack.
Vitaly Ginzburg, 93, Russian physicist, Nobel Prize laureate.
Burleigh Hines, 74, American journalist.
Sir Patrick Howard-Dobson, 88, British army general.
Karl Kroeber, 83, American literary scholar of Native American literature, cancer.
Malcolm Laycock, 71, British radio DJ.
Igor Starygin, 63, Russian actor, complications from a stroke.

9
Sedley Andrus, 94, British herald.
Al Cervi, 92, American basketball player and coach (Rochester Royals, Syracuse Nationals).
Earl Cooley, 98, American smokejumper.
Clen Denning, 98, Australian footballer, oldest surviving Australian Football League player.
Henry L. Kimelman, 88, American Ambassador to Haiti (1980–1981), heart failure.
Earsell Mackbee, 68, American football player (Minnesota Vikings), complications following a stroke.
Ib Olsen, 80, Danish Olympic bronze medal-winning (1948) rower.
Mehdi Sahabi, 66, Iranian writer and translator, heart attack.
Charles Proctor Sifton, 74, American federal judge, sarcoidosis.
Stephen Edmund Verney, 90, British Anglican prelate, Bishop of Repton (1977–1985).
Nick Waterlow, 69, British-born Australian artistic director and curator, stabbed.

10
Robert Cameron, 98, American aerial photographer.
Gheorghe Dinică, 75, Romanian actor, cardiac arrest. 
Robert Enke, 32, German footballer, suicide by train impact.
Tomaž Humar, 40, Slovenian mountaineer, mountaineering accident.
Simple Kapadia, 51, Indian actress and costume designer, cancer.
Dick Katz, 85, American jazz pianist and arranger, lung cancer.
David Lloyd, 75, American comedy writer ("Chuckles Bites the Dust"), prostate cancer.
Uolevi Manninen, 72, Finnish Olympic basketball player. 
Hisaya Morishige, 96, Japanese actor, natural causes.
John Allen Muhammad, 48, American convicted spree killer (Beltway Sniper), executed by lethal injection.
Anne Mustoe, 76, British headmistress, cyclist and writer.
Ramin Pourandarjani, 26, Iranian doctor, whistleblower on use of torture, poisoned.
José Afonso Ribeiro, 80, Brazilian Roman Catholic Bishop of Borba. (Portuguese)

11
Dámaso Ruiz-Jarabo Colomer, 60, Spanish jurist, Advocate General of the European Court of Justice.
Keith Fagnou, 38, Canadian organic chemist, complications of H1N1 influenza.
Ehsan Fatahian, 28, Iranian Kurdish activist, executed by hanging.
William Ganz, 90, Slovak-born American cardiologist, co-inventor of the pulmonary artery catheter, natural causes.
Henry Jayasena, 78, Sri Lankan actor, colon cancer.
Irving Kriesberg, 90, American expressionist artist, complications from Parkinson's disease.
Tom Merriman, 85, American jingle composer, complications from a fall.
Marvin Minoff, 78, American film and television producer (The Nixon Interviews, Patch Adams).
John Jay O'Connor, 79, American lawyer, husband of Sandra Day O'Connor, Alzheimer's disease.
Helge Reiss, 81, Norwegian actor.

12
Elisabeth Aasen, 87, Norwegian politician.
Mohamed Abdi Aware, Somali judge, Chief Justice of Puntland, shot.
Vagrich Bakhchanyan, 71, Ukrainian-born American painter, apparent suicide. (Russian)
Frances Lasker Brody, 93, American art collector and philanthropist.
Eleanor Hovda, 69, American composer and dancer.
Robert Kendall, 82, American actor, heart attack.
Willy Kernen, 80, Swiss footballer, participated in World Cup (1950, 1954, 1962). (French)
James R. Lilley, 81, American diplomat, ambassador to South Korea and China, complications linked to prostate cancer.
Henri Sérandour, 72, French International Olympic Committee member, former head of the French National Olympic Committee. 
Florence Temko, 88, American origami expert, heart failure.
Paul Wendkos, 87, American television and film director (Gidget), complications of a stroke.
Emanuel Zisman, 74, Israeli politician, Member of Knesset (1988–1999). (Bulgarian)

13
Roy Butler, 83, American politician, first directly elected mayor of Austin, Texas (1971–1975), complications from a fall.
Emin Doybak, 78–79, Turkish Olympic sprinter.
Michał Gajownik, 27, Polish Olympic sprint canoer, traffic collision. 
Ueli Gegenschatz, 38, Swiss BASE jumper, jumping accident.
Dell Hymes, 82, American anthropologist, linguist and folklorist, complications of Alzheimer's disease.
Bruce King, 85, American politician, three-term Governor of New Mexico, complications from heart procedure.
Ron Klimkowski, 65, American baseball player, heart failure.
Bernard Kolélas, 76, Congolese politician, Mayor of Brazzaville, prime minister (1997).
Mara Manzan, 57, Brazilian actress, lung cancer. (Portuguese)
John J. O'Connor, 76, American television critic (The New York Times), lung cancer.
Armen Takhtajan, 99, Soviet botanist.

14
Nikolay Anikin, 77, Russian-born American Olympic gold medal skiing champion (1956 Olympics), cancer.
Edgar Fay, 101, British judge.
Moshe Gidron, 84, Israeli Major General.
John F. Gregory, 82, American optical engineer.
Thomas Hollyman, 89, American photographer.
Travis LaRue, 96, American politician, Mayor of Austin, Texas (1969–1971).
John David McWilliam, 68, British politician,  MP for Blaydon (1979–2005).
Lewis Millett, 88, American Medal of Honor recipient.
David A. Olsen, 71, American businessman.
 Ladislav Sitenský, 90, Czech photographer.

15
Derek B, 44, British rapper, heart attack.
Tia Barrett, 62, New Zealand ambassador and diplomat, High Commissioner to the Cook Islands (2009).
Richard Carlyle, 95, Canadian actor.
Ray Charnley, 74, English footballer (Blackpool, Morecambe).
Dennis Cole, 69, American actor, renal failure.
Andriy Fedchuk, 29, Ukrainian Olympic bronze medal-winning boxer (2000), traffic collision.
Karol Galba, 88, Slovak football official.
Pierre Harmel, 98, Belgian politician, prime minister (1965–1966).
Natalicio Lima, 91, Brazilian guitarist (Los Indios Tabajaras), stomach cancer.
Ambrose Mathalaimuthu, 84, Indian Bishop of Coimbatore.
Hans Matthöfer, 84, German politician, minister of finance (1978–1982).
Anna Mendelssohn, 61, British poet and political activist (Angry Brigade), brain tumour. 
Allan Murdmaa, 75, Estonian architect. 
Ken Ober, 52, American comedian and game show host (Remote Control).
Patriarch Pavle, 95, Serbian 44th Patriarch of the Serbian Orthodox Church, cardiac arrest.
Jim Pead, 85, Australian politician.
Jocelyn Quivrin, 30, French actor, car accident. 
Earl Wentz, 71, American composer and performer.

16
Pablo Amaringo, 71, Peruvian artist.
Eddie Bell, 78, American football player (Philadelphia Eagles, New York Titans), heart failure.
Jeff Clyne, 72, British jazz bassist, heart attack.
Antonio de Nigris, 31, Mexican football player, heart failure.
Robert J. Frankel, 68, American thoroughbred horse trainer, leukemia.
Jan Leighton, 87, American actor, complications from a stroke.
Anne-Sofie Østvedt, 89, Norwegian intelligence operative for XU. 
Jack Wong Sue, 84, Australian Z Special Unit member and businessman.
Harry Taylor, 83, Canadian ice hockey player.
Olivia Patricia Thomas, 114, American supercentenarian, third-oldest person in the world.
Bucky Williams, 102, American baseball player, second-oldest Negro league baseball player.
Edward Woodward, 79, British actor (The Equalizer, The Wicker Man, Hot Fuzz).

17
José Aboulker, 89, Algerian World War II resistance fighter.
Peter Armstrong, 80, American Roman Catholic priest, apparent heart attack.
John Craxton, 87, British painter.
Mickey Dias, 88, Sri Lankan-born British legal scholar.
Niku Kheradmand, 77, Iranian actress, complications of a heart attack.
Nikolay Olyalin, 68, Russian actor. 
Sy Syms, 83, American entrepreneur, founder and chairman of off-price clothier SYMS, heart failure.

18
Johnny Almond, 63, British jazz and rock musician (Mark-Almond), cancer.
Abrar Alvi, 82, Indian film director and screenwriter (Sahib Bibi Aur Ghulam), stomach complications.
Albert Crewe, 82, British-born American physicist, invented scanning transmission electron microscope, Parkinson's disease.
Jeanne-Claude, 74, French environmental artist (The Gates), complications from a ruptured brain aneurysm.
Gordon Hewit, 51, British Olympic swimmer.
Red Robbins, 65, American basketball player, cancer.
Salem Saad, 31, Emirati footballer (Al-Nasr SC), heart attack.
Ana Vásquez-Bronfman, 77, Chilean sociologist and writer.

19
Frank Beattie, 76, Scottish footballer (Kilmarnock F.C.).
Johnny Delgado, 61, Filipino actor, lymphoma.
John Malcolm Gray, 75, British banker.
Daul Kim, 20, South Korean fashion model, suicide by hanging.
Pat Mackie, 95, New Zealand-born Australian trade unionist.
Denis McNamara, 83, British Olympic wrestler.
David Nokes, 61, British scholar.
Sir Noel Power, 79, Australian acting Chief Justice of the Supreme Court of Hong Kong (1996–1997), heart attack.
Jim Stanfield, 62, Canadian ice hockey player.
Nao Takasugi, 87, American politician, member of the California State Assembly (1993–1999), stroke.

20
Robert Foxcroft, 75, Canadian Olympic fencer.
Martino Gomiero, 85, Italian Roman Catholic Bishop of Adria-Rovigo.
Ghulam Mustafa Jatoi, 78, Pakistani politician, Chief Minister of Sindh (1973–1977); prime minister (1990).
Lino Lacedelli, 83, Italian mountaineer, first man to reach the summit of K2.
H. C. Robbins Landon, 83, American musicologist.
Celso Pitta, 63, Brazilian politician, Mayor of São Paulo (1997–2000), colorectal cancer. (Portuguese)
Herbert Richers, 86, Brazilian filmmaker and voice artist, kidney failure.
Max Robertson, 94, British radio broadcaster.
Alejandro R. Ruiz, 85, American World War II Medal of Honor recipient.
Lester Shubin, 84, American developer of the bulletproof Kevlar vest, heart attack.
Elisabeth Söderström, 82, Swedish soprano, complications from a stroke.
Roman Trakhtenberg, 41, Russian actor, television and radio presenter, heart attack.
Ted Weill, 84, American politician.
Charis Wilson, 95, American model and writer.

21
Gerhard Aspheim, 79, Norwegian jazz trombonist. 
Bernard Bonnin, 70, Filipino actor, diabetes.
Sir Edward Fennessy, 97, British electronic engineer.
Konstantin Feoktistov, 83, Russian cosmonaut and aerospace engineer. 
Frank Fidler, 86, English footballer (Bournemouth, Hereford United).
Tom Janik, 69, American footballer (Denver Broncos, Buffalo Bills).
Ken Krueger, 83, American publisher, co-founder and chairman of San Diego Comic-Con International, heart attack.
Rena Kanokogi, 74, American judoka, multiple myeloma.
Johnny Påhlsson, 68, Swedish Olympic sport shooter.
Paige Palmer, 93, American fitness trainer.
Art Savage, 58, American CEO (San Jose Sharks) (1990–1996) and co-owner (Sacramento River Cats) (1999–2009), lung cancer.
Allen Shelton, 73, American banjo player, leukemia.

22
Billy Joe Daugherty, 57, American Christian minister, lymphoma.
Sir John Grugeon, 81, British politician.
Ali Kordan, 51, Iranian politician, Minister of the Interior (2008), multiple myeloma.
Juan Carlos Muñoz, 90, Argentinian footballer, heart attack. (Spanish)
Haydain Neale, 39, Canadian singer–songwriter (jacksoul), lung cancer.
Francisco Rodriguez, 25, American Golden Gloves boxer, brain injury sustained during match.
Emile Vanfasse, 69, French Polynesian politician, finance minister (2004–2006).

23
José Arraño Acevedo, 88, Chilean writer and historian, pneumonia. (Spanish)
Paul K. Carlton, 88, American Air Force general.
Jean-Édouard Desmedt, 83, Belgian scientist.
Philip Kueber, 75, Canadian Olympic silver medal-winning (1956) rower.
Pim Koopman, 56, Dutch progressive rock drummer (Kayak).
Richard Meale, 77, Australian composer.
Tony Parry, 64, British footballer (Hartlepool United), pneumonia.
Pat Quinn, 74, Irish businessman, founder of the Quinnsworth supermarket chain, renal failure.
Frederick H. Schultz, 80, American businessman and politician, Speaker of the Florida House of Representatives (1969–1970).
Yang Xianyi, 94, Chinese translator.

24
Ayub Afridi, 70-79, Pakistani drug smuggler and politician.
Amy Black, 36, British mezzo-soprano opera singer.
*Chan Hung Lit, 66, Hong Kong actor, heart failure. 
Francis French, 7th Baron de Freyne, 82, Irish aristocrat.
Gonçalves Isabelinha, 100, Portuguese footballer and physician. 
Irena Nawrocka, 92, Polish Olympic fencer. 
George Parsons, 83, British rugby union and rugby league player.
Abe Pollin, 85, American businessman, owner of Washington Wizards and Washington Capitals, corticobasal degeneration.
Hale Smith, 84, American composer and arranger, complications of a stroke.
Samak Sundaravej, 74, Thai politician, prime minister (2008), liver cancer.

25
Albert Dolhats, 88, French cyclist.
Jean Serge Essous, 74, Congolese musician. (French)
Beatrice Gray, 98, American actress.
Giorgio Carbone, 73, Italian self-proclaimed head of state of the Principality of Seborga micronation.
Frans Haarsma, 88, Dutch professor of pastoral theology. 
William Norman, 77, New Zealand cricketer.

26
Avery Clayton, 62, American executive director, heart attack.
Peter Forakis, 82, American artist.
Robert J. Fox, 81, American Catholic priest, cancer.
Nikola Kovachev, 75, Bulgarian football player and manager. 
Lis Løwert, 89, Danish film actress. 
Geoffrey Moorhouse, 77, British journalist and author, stroke.
Ecaterina Stahl-Iencic, 60, Romanian Olympic fencer.

27
Mariano Abarca, 51, Mexican activist, shot.
Al Alberts, 87, American singer (The Four Aces), kidney failure.
Jacques Baratier, 91, French film director and screenwriter. 
Erich Böhme, 79, German journalist, editor of Der Spiegel (1973–1989), cancer. 
Jacques Braunstein, 78, Romanian-born Venezuelan economist, publicist and jazz disc jockey, heart failure. (Spanish)
William Bresnan, 75, American businessman, founder of Bresnan Communications, cancer.
Jeffrey Grayson, 67, American businessman and criminal.
Bess Lomax Hawes, 88, American folklorist and musician, stroke.
Geneviève Joy, 90, French pianist.
Alice McGrath, 92, American activist (Sleepy Lagoon murder trial), infection from a chronic illness.
Sir Anthony Mullens, 73, British army general.
Mike Penner, 52, American sportswriter (Los Angeles Times), suicide.
Irving Tripp, 88, American comic book artist (Little Lulu), cancer.
Larry Turner, 70, American politician, member of the Tennessee House of Representatives (since 1985).
Warren Vanders, 79, American actor, lung cancer.

28
René Barret, 87, French cyclist.
Gilles Carle, 81, Canadian film director and screenwriter, complications from Parkinson's disease.
David Aaron Clark, 49, American pornographic actor and film director, pulmonary embolism.
Bjartmar Gjerde, 78, Norwegian politician, cabinet minister and broadcasting executive. 
Bob Keane, 87, American music producer and manager, founder of Del-Fi Records, renal failure.
Eric Waldram Kemp, 94, British Church of England theologian, Bishop of Chichester (1974–2001).
Tony Kendall, 73, Italian actor (Kommissar X series).
Patrick Konchellah, 41, Kenyan runner, stomach cancer.
Samuel Martin, 85, American linguist.
Koichi Saito, 80, Japanese film director and photographer, pneumonia.
Jerry Shipkey, 84, American football player.
* Joaquín Vargas Gómez, 84, Mexican media owner, founder of MVS Comunicaciones, natural causes. (Spanish)

29
Don Addis, 74, American strip artist, lung cancer.
 Prince Alexander of Belgium, 67, Belgian royal, pulmonary embolism.
 Andrew Donald Booth, 91, British computer scientist.
 Mary Call Darby Collins, 98, American First Lady of Florida (1955–1961).
 George Cummins, 78, Irish footballer (Everton, Luton Town, Republic of Ireland).
 Nora David, Baroness David, 96, British politician, member of the House of Lords.
Gilbert-Antoine Duchêne, 90, French Bishop of Saint-Claude (1975–1994).
 Princess Farial of Egypt, 71, Egyptian royal, oldest child of King Farouk, stomach cancer.
 Ghalib Bin Ali, 96, Omani Ibadi religious leader. (Arabic) 
 Robert Holdstock, 61, British science fiction author, Escherichia coli infection.
 Solange Magnano, 38, Argentinian beauty queen (Miss Argentina, 1994), pulmonary embolism.
 Richard Mayne, 83, British international civil servant, broadcaster and critic.
 Karl Peglau, 82, German traffic psychologist, creator of the Ampelmännchen traffic lights.
 Lee Pelty, 74, American stage actor, lung cancer.
 Jerneja Perc, 38, Slovenian athlete, cancer. 
 John Storm Roberts, 73, American ethnomusician.
 Roy Hendry Thomson, 77, British politician.

30
 Christopher Anvil, 84, American science fiction writer.
 George Atkins, 92, Canadian radio and TV presenter (CBC), founder of Farm Radio International, kidney failure.
Mustafa Avcioğlu-Çakmak, 99, Turkish Olympic wrestler.
 Dot Bailey, 92, New Zealand cricketer.
 George Bickford, 82, Australian football player.
 Asim Butt, 42, Pakistani-born British cricketer.
 Emile Eid, 84, Lebanese Roman Catholic titular bishop of Sarepta dei Maroniti.
 Brent Green, 33, Australian football player, drowned.
 Charles Miller Metzner, 97, American federal judge.
 Paul Naschy, 75, Spanish actor, screenwriter and director, pancreatic cancer.
 Milorad Pavić, 80, Serbian writer, heart failure.
 Lucian Pulvermacher, 91, American head of the True Catholic Church.
Norman Douglas McFarlane.

References

2009-11
 11